Marcy Barge is a professor of mathematics at Montana State University.

Barge received his Ph.D. from the University of Colorado at Boulder in 1980.

In 2012, Barge became a fellow of the American Mathematical Society.

References

Year of birth missing (living people)
Living people
Fellows of the American Mathematical Society
20th-century American mathematicians
21st-century American mathematicians
University of Colorado Boulder alumni
Montana State University faculty